Sunil Uniyal 'Gama' is an Indian politician from Uttarakhand representing the Bharatiya Janata Party. In 2018 Dehradun Municipal Corporation election, he was elected as the mayor of Dehradun and defeated veteran Congress leader Dinesh Agrawal with a margin of 35,632 votes.

Elections contested

Dehradun Municipal Corporation

References 

People from Dehradun district
Bharatiya Janata Party politicians from Uttarakhand
Mayors of Dehradun
Living people
Year of birth missing (living people)